Come, Closer is a 2010 South Korean indie romance melodrama film. A directorial debut by Kim Jong-kwan and starring Yoon Kye-sang, Jung Yu-mi, Yoon Hee-seok and Yozoh, the full-length omnibus tells the love story of five couples. It made its debut at the 15th Busan International Film Festival in 2010.

Synopsis
An omnibus film of the romances and breakups of five couples:

Soo-jin (Kim Hyo-seo) works in a cafe in Seoul. One day, she receives a call at work from a Polish man in Rotterdam, who tells her the story of his missing fiance.

Eun-hee (Jung Yu-mi) shows up one night and blames her ex-boyfriend Hyun-oh (Yoon Kye-sang) for ruining her life. Although she has a new relationship, she is still upset that Hyun-oh breaks up with her.

Se-yeon (Yeom Bo-ra) seduces Young-soo (Oh Chang-seok), who is rumoured to be dating a man. Young-soo's long-time lover Woon-chul (Jang Seo-won) is heartbroken when he makes a confession and decides to end their relationship.

Indie bandmates Hye-young (Yozoh) and Joo-young (Yoon Hee-seok) discuss about love while taking a walk in Namsan park.

Cast
 Yoon Kye-sang as Hyun-oh
 Jung Yu-mi as Eun-hee
 Yoon Hee-seok as Joo-young
 Yozoh as Hye-young
 Jang Seo-won as Woon-chul
 Oh Chang-seok as Young-soo
 Kim Jung-heon as Yeong-soo's friend
 Yeom Bo-ra as Se-yeon 
 Kim Hyo-seo as Soo-jin

Reception

References

External links 
 
 
 

2010 films
2010s Korean-language films
South Korean romantic drama films
Films directed by Kim Jong-kwan
2010 romantic drama films
2010s South Korean films